Pseudocoremia cineracia is a species of moth in the family Geometridae. It is endemic to New Zealand. It is classified as Nationally Vulnerable by the Department of Conservation.

Taxonomy 
This species was first described by George Howes in 1942 from specimens obtained at Moke Lake and taken in January and February. Howes named it Selidosema cineracia. This name was also used when the species was discussed by George Vernon Hudson in 1950. In 1988 John S. Dugdale assigned the species to the genus Pseudocoremia. This classification of the species into Pseudocoremia is regarded as unsatisfactory. As such the species is also currently known as Pseudocoremia (s.l.) cineracia. The hototype specimen is held at the Museum of New Zealand Te Papa Tongarewa.

Description 
The larvae are coloured grey.

Howes described the adult male of the species as follows:

Distribution 
This species is endemic to New Zealand. The species range of this moth is Mackenzie, Central Otago and Otago Lakes. Other than its type locality, this species occurs at Stony Beach at Okains Bay, Big Spur Creek & Cluden Stream at Cluden Station in Otago and Kawarau Gorge.

Biology and host species 
The host species of this moth is Olearia odorata. The species is attracted to sugar lures. The adults are on the wing August until June with the species being more common in September.

Habitat 
P. cineracia inhabits montane shrublands at an altitude of between 150-850m.

Conservation status 
This species has been classified under the New Zealand Threat Classification system as being Nationally Vulnerable. P. cineracia is classified as nationally vulnerable partially because of its reliance on its host plant which is suffering a decline as a result of habitat destruction.

References

Boarmiini
Moths of New Zealand
Endemic fauna of New Zealand
Moths described in 1942
Endangered biota of New Zealand
Taxa named by George Howes (entomologist)
Endemic moths of New Zealand